Maurine Karagianis (born August 17, 1950) is a Canadian politician, formerly the New Democratic Party MLA for the riding of Esquimalt-Royal Roads in the Legislative Assembly of British Columbia.

She was first elected in the 2005 election to the constituency of Esquimalt-Metchosin, garnering almost 50 percent of votes cast and 2,895 more votes than the next closest candidate. She was re-elected in 2009 to the new constituency of Esquimalt-Royal Roads and again in 2013.

In August 2007, Karagianis was appointed the Official Opposition Critic for the Ministry of Transportation in New Democrat leader Carole James' shadow cabinet. She had previously served as the Official Opposition Critic for the Ministry Children and Family Development, and, prior to that, the Ministry of Small Business and Revenue. Following the 2009 election, Maurine was again appointed as the Official Opposition Critic for the Ministry of Children and Family Development. In January 2011, Maurine was elected as Official Opposition Caucus Whip and served in that position until her retirement. In June 2014, Maurine was appointed as Advocate for Seniors, Women & Childcare & Early Learning.

Karagianis retired from provincial politics in May 2017. Prior to serving as an MLA, she was elected as a municipal councillor in Esquimalt in 1996, and re-elected in 1999 and again in 2002. She is currently keeping bees, blogging about that and other topics, and once again doing some work in the affordable housing sector. In August 2018, she was appointed Chair of the Board of Directors of the Knowledge Network and retired from that role in 2022.

Starting in 1998, she served three years with the provincial government as assistant to three NDP cabinet ministers – first in the Social Services ministry and then in Transportation and Highways. From 2001 to 2005, she ran a consulting company working with non-profit organizations and First Nations to create seniors housing in BC.

Prior to entering politics she was an entrepreneur, opening her own retail fashion store, operating a wholesale venture and a successful import/export business. She was also a co-founder of the Sunshine Folkfest in Powell River, BC.

Electoral results

References

External links 
Maurine Karagianis
Legislative Assembly of British Columbia

British Columbia New Democratic Party MLAs
Canadian people of Greek descent
Living people
Women MLAs in British Columbia
Women municipal councillors in Canada
British Columbia municipal councillors
1950 births
People from Esquimalt, British Columbia
21st-century Canadian politicians
21st-century Canadian women politicians